Belle Maison is a historic home located at Liberty, Clay County, Missouri. 404 S. Leonard Street Built in 1875.  Its style is Italianate Asymmetrical
This house consists of a two-story polygonal wing attached to a rectangular wing.  The two-story veranda with railed porch and entrances for cross ventilation reflects a Southern influence.  Interesting features include the stone-incised fluer-de-lis keystones.
Source: Liberty's Living Legacy – 19th Century Houses and Buildings 1820 – 1899
Written by: Christopher Harris  c. 2004

It was listed on the National Register of Historic Places in 1978.

References

Houses on the National Register of Historic Places in Missouri
Houses completed in 1889
Buildings and structures in Clay County, Missouri
National Register of Historic Places in Clay County, Missouri
Liberty, Missouri